The Bakhtiyarpur–Tajpur Bridge, currently under construction, will span the river Ganges, connecting Bakhtiyarpur in Patna and Tajpur in Samastipur in the Indian state of Bihar. Upon completion in Dec 2020, the bridge will provide an easy roadway link between the northern and southern parts of Bihar.

The project
Current chief minister Nitish Kumar inaugurated the construction of the  bridge in June, 2011. Upon completion in Dec 2023, the bridge will reduce the load on Mahatma Gandhi Setu and also reduce the traffic in the capital city of Patna.

A road bridge parallel to the existing rail and road  bridge, Rajendra Setu, has also been planned.

The bridge will also require construction of 45.393 km of approach roads on both ends of the bridge.

The total cost of the project is estimated at Rs 1602.74 crore, out of which Rs 100 crores will be spent on acquiring land. At first, Rs 917.74 crore is to be invested by Navayuga Engineering Company Limited (NECL) as a viability gap fund on a PPP basis. Rs 277.50 crore is to be invested by the Centre, and Rs 307.50 crore by the state government. The Bihar government would also bear the cost of acquiring land. NECL, a Hyderabad-based firm, was selected through competitive bidding.

Project is delayed and work is on halt for last few years.

See also
 
 
 
 
 List of road–rail bridges
 List of longest bridges above water in India
 Loknayak Ganga Path
 Kacchi Dargah–Bidupur bridge
 Digha–Sonpur Bridge

References

External links

Bridges in Bihar
Patna district
Saran district
Bridges over the Ganges
Road bridges in India